Acartia hudsonica is a species of marine copepod belonging to the family Acartiidae. Acartia hudsonica is a coastal, cold water species that can be found along the northwest Atlantic coast.

Acartia hudsonica was originally described as a subspecies of Acartia clausi, but subsequent research concluded it is sufficiently distinct to warrant specific status. It is found in shallow coastal habitats along both the Atlantic and Pacific coasts of northern North America

Anatomy
Acartia hudsonica anatomy is different for the nauplius (larval) stage than the copepodite (juvenile) and adult stages. A nauplius has a head and a tail, but no defined abdominal region. After six stages of molting, a nauplius develops into a copepodite, which now has a distinct abdomen. After molting six more times, a copepodite will have grown enough to be considered an adult copepod.

An adult copepod is usually under 1 millimeter long. Their bodies are split up into three sections: 1. the head (cephalosome); 2. the abdomen (metasome); and 3. the tail (urosome). The head has a single eye in the center with two pairs of antenna, one long and one short. Copepods also have five pairs of swimming legs that are located on the underside of the abdomen.

An anatomical characteristic that distinguish A. hudsonica from other Acartia species is blue lines on the anterior of their abdomen.

Distribution

Geographic
Like all Acartia species, A. hudsonica is found primarily in estuaries. They can be found in open coastal waters, as well, but they are less abundant in those regions. A. hudsonica is not found farther south than Chesapeake Bay, and is not found farther north than Labrador/Newfoundland.

Temporal
A trait specific to A. hudsonica is that they are only found in cool water. North of Cape Cod, the water stays cold enough throughout the year for A. hudsonica to be abundant year-round. However, south of Cape Cod A. hudsonica is only found in the winter and spring months. This is because the summer and fall months are too warm for the A. hudsonica population to thrive. In response to this temperature increase A. hudsonica has developed a genetic mutation that allows it to lay two different types of eggs: subitaneous and diapause eggs. Subitaneous eggs hatch immediately. Diapause eggs are laid when water temperatures rise above 16˚C and then hatch when exposed to temperatures more typical of winter and spring.

Climate change is affecting the temporal distribution of A. hudsonica in southern estuaries. Temperatures in the winter have warmed more than temperatures in the spring, changing the biologically important threshold for winter-spring species in estuaries. This is causing a population pulse of A. hudsonica to occur about 1.5-2.0 months earlier.

Genetic
It has been found that there are geography distinct subgroups of A. hudsonica along the west Atlantic coast. The first group is from Rhode Island/South Coast Massachusetts/Cape Cod to southern Maine, the second group is from southern Connecticut/Long Island Sound, and the third group is from southern New Jersey. It is thought that the genetic isolation of these subgroups of A. hudsonica has developed because of its geographical isolation in estuaries. This isolation might also contribute to the higher genetic variation within A. hudsonica than other Acartia species.

Ecological significance
Zooplankton play an important role in the pelagic food web by linking primary producers to higher trophic levels, and significantly contribute to biogeochemical cycles. A. hudsonica will feed on a variety of organisms including phytoplankton, heterotrophic protists and mixotrophic protists. The energy gained from their prey then gets transferred up the food web when the A. hudsonica themselves are eaten. A literature review done in 1984 showed that copepods, including Acartia, are the most frequently recorded prey of larval fish. And subsequent research has continued to document this trend.

With the changing climate the size of estuarine copepods, such as A. hudsonica, are decreasing, which could disrupt the predator-prey interaction that commonly occurs between fish larvae (predators) and copepods (prey). If the dynamic of this interaction changes then the community structure and ecological function of estuaries could be altered.

References

 Milligan, P. J., Stahl, E. A., Schizas, N. V., & Turner, J. T. (2010). Phylogeography of the copepod Acartia hudsonica in estuaries of the northeastern United States. Hydrobiologia, 666(1), 155–165.
 Bradford, J. M., 1976. Partial revision of the Acartia subgenus Acartiura (Copepoda: Calanoida: Acartiidae). New Zealand Journal of Marine and Freshwater Research 10: 159–202.
 Biologydictionary.net Editors. (2014). Copepod Definition, Characteristic and Lifecycle. Retrieved November 4, 2014, from Copepod: Definition, Characteristics and Lifecycle
Copepod Printout - Enchanted Learning Software. (n.d.). Retrieved from Copepod Printout - Enchanted Learning Software
Lee, W. Y. & B. J. McAlice, 1979. Seasonal succession and breeding cycles of three species of Acartia (Copepoda: Calanoida) in a Maine estuary. Estuaries 2: 228–235
 Turner, J. T., 1994a. Planktonic copepods of Boston Harbor, Massachusetts Bay and Cape Cod Bay, 1992. In Ferrari, F. D. & B. P. Bradley (eds), Ecology and Morphology of Copepods. Proceedings of the 5th International Conference on Copepoda, Baltimore, MD, June 6–12, 1993. Hydrobiologia 292/293: 405–413.
Sullivan, B. K., J. H. Costello & D. Van Keuren, 2007. Seasonality of the copepods Acartia hudsonica and Acartia tonsa in Narragansett Bay, RI, USA during a period of climate change. Estuarine Coastal Shelf Science 73: 259–267.
Sullivan, B. K., & Mcmanus, L. T. (1986). Factors controlling seasonal succession of the copepods Acartia hudsonica and A. tonsa in Narragansett Bay, Rhode Island: Temperature and resting egg production. Marine Ecology Progress Series, 28, 121–128.
Rice, E., Dam, H. G., & Stewart, G. (2014). Impact of Climate Change on Estuarine Zooplankton: Surface Water Warming in Long Island Sound Is Associated with Changes in Copepod Size and Community Structure. Estuaries and Coasts, 38(1), 13–23.
Dam, H.G., M.R. Roman, and M.J. Youngbluth. 1995. Downward export of respiratory carbon and dissolved organic nitrogen by diel migrant mesozooplankton at the JGOFS Bermuda timeseries station. Deep-Sea Research I 42: 1187–1197.
Vargas, C., & González, H. (2004). Plankton community structure and carbon cycling in a coastal upwelling system. II. Microheterotrophic pathway. Aquatic Microbial Ecology, 34, 165–180.
Turner JT. 1984b. The feeding ecology of some zooplankters that are important prey items of larval fish. NOAA Tech. Rep. NMFS 7: 1-28.
Turner, J. T. (2004). The Importance of Small Planktonic Copepods and Their Roles in Pelagic Marine Food Web. Zoological Studies, 43(2), 255–266.

Calanoida
Crustaceans described in 1926